The House at 22 Parker Road is one of a few high style Colonial Revival houses in Wakefield, Massachusetts.  The -story wood-frame house is estimated to have been built in the 1880s.  It has a hip roof, corner pilasters, and gable end dormers, the center one having a swan-neck design.  The main facade is divided into three sections: the leftmost has a rounded bay with three windows on each level, and the right section has a Palladian window configuration on the first floor, and a pair of windows on the second.  The central section has the front door, sheltered by a porch that wraps around to the right side, flanked by sidelights and topped by a fanlight.  Above the front door is a porch door flanked by wide windows and topped by a half-round window with Gothic style insets.

The house was listed on the National Register of Historic Places in 1989.

See also
National Register of Historic Places listings in Wakefield, Massachusetts
National Register of Historic Places listings in Middlesex County, Massachusetts

References

Houses on the National Register of Historic Places in Wakefield, Massachusetts
Colonial Revival architecture in Massachusetts
Houses in Wakefield, Massachusetts